Barro Humano is a 1929 Brazilian film directed by Adhemar Gonzaga, starring Gracia Morena, Lelita Rosa, Carlos Modesto and Eva Schnoor in the main roles. Carmen Miranda would have appeared as an extra in a scene.

Cast 
Gracia Morena	...	Vera
Lelita Rosa	...	Gilda
Eva Schnoor	...	Helena
Eva Nil	...	Diva
Carlos Modesto	...	Mário
Martha Torá	...	Emília
Luiza Valle	...	Dona Chincha
Oli Mar	...	Juquinha
Lia Renée	...	Lia
Carmem Violeta	...	Dançarina de tango
Gina Cavalieri	...	Amiga de Helena

References

Bibliography 
GOMES, Paulo Emilio Sales. Humberto Mauro, Cataguases, Cinearte. São Paulo: Perspectiva, 1974.
GONZAGA, Alice. 50 Anos de Cinédia. Rio de Janeiro, Record, 1987.
MIRANDA, Luis Felipe. Dicionário de Cineastas brasileiros. São Paulo: Art Editora, 1990.
RAMOS, Fernão e MIRANDA, Luis Felipe. Enciclopédia do Cinema Brasileiro. São Paulo: Senac, 2000.
SCHVARZMAN, Sheila. Filmando a Mulher no Cinema Mudo Brasileiro.  Accesso: RG(A) - ArtCultura, v. 7, n. 10, jan.-jun. 2005. p. 55-64
SOUTO, Gilberto. O Cinema Novo dos anos vinte. Filme e Cultura, n.4, pp. 40–2, abril 1967.
XAVIER, Ismail. Sétima Arte: um culto moderno. São Paulo: Perspectiva, 1978.

External links
 Official website

1929 films
1920s Portuguese-language films
1929 musical films
Films directed by Adhemar Gonzaga
Brazilian musical films
Brazilian black-and-white films